Carlo Mazzone-Clementi (12 December 1920 – 5 November 2000) was a performer and founder of two schools of commedia, mime and physical theater as well as a contemporary and colleague of leaders of modern European theater. From his arrival in the USA in 1957, he was largely responsible for the spreading of commedia dell'arte in North America.

He first gained attention in Italy in 1947 alongside Marcel Marceau in the mime’s first tour outside of Paris.  From 1948 to 1951, he assisted Jacques Lecoq, while Lecoq taught and directed the Players of Padua University. In 1954, Mazzone-Clementi was at Piccolo Teatro di Milano with Dario Fo and Franca Rame.

While he was performing with Piccolo Teatro as well as teaching in Rome, the American theatre scholar and director Eric Bentley came to Italy to direct the Padua Players company in the first Italian production of Bertolt Brecht. Then, with Bentley’s patronage, Mazzone-Clementi toured the United States in 1958, conducting workshops in mime and commedia, and introducing the leather masks of Amleto Sartori to this country. That led to a teaching assignment at the Carnegie Institute of Technology, followed by Brandeis University, the University of California at Berkeley, the American Conservatory Theater and others.  He was known as Carlo Mazzone until 1965 when he worked with the new acting ensemble at the Theatre of Lincoln Center. From then on he was known as Carlo Mazzone-Clementi. Clementi was the name of his mother and his grandfather, Girolamo Clementi, who was versed in the work of Paduan playwright and forerunner of commedia dell'arte, Angelo Beolco, known as "Ruzzante."

In 1972, Mazzone-Clementi and his wife Jane Hill, a graduate of Carnegie-Mellon, went to Humboldt County, California to conduct summer workshops at their rural property.  From this experience came the decision to re-locate permanently in Humboldt and to establish a full-time actor training program. In 1974, the couple purchased the Oddfellows Hall in Blue Lake, California and co-founded the Dell’Arte School of Mime and Comedy, now known as the Dell'Arte International School of Physical Theatre.   Hill also joined the faculty at College of the Redwoods, where the pair created the Grand Comedy Festival at Qual-a-wa-loo, a summer repertory festival that produced plays of Shakespeare in rotation with musical adaptations of those plays; Mazzone-Clementi served as the festival’s artistic director for six years. In 1974 their article, "Commedia and the Actor" was published in The Drama Review TDR (journal).

Mazzone-Clementi moved to Copenhagen, Denmark in 1984 and founded a second sister theater school there, named the Commedia School. In 1994 returned to California and continued teaching until shortly before his death on 5 November 2000 in San Francisco.

Performing History
In addition to his work with the Padua Players, touring with Marceau, and the Piccolo, he worked with Vittorio Gassman's National Theatre in Rome in 1953. Carlo appeared in over a dozen films, including Ulysses with Kirk Douglas.  Often cast for his talents as a mime, he appeared as "The Cock" in the world premiere of Sean O'Casey's Cock-A-Doodle Dandy in New York in 1958. Represented by the agent Toby Cole, in 1958 and '59 he toured his solo show, Six Characters In Search of Commedia. He performed at a number of International Mime Festivals held in the 1970s and 1980s, and played in Birds of a Feather with the Dell'Arte Company at the 1980 Venice Biennale.

References

1920 births
Carnegie Mellon University
Italian emigrants to the United States
College of the Redwoods faculty
2000 deaths
20th-century Italian male actors
Place of birth missing